General elections were held in Paraguay on 22 April 2018. President Horacio Cartes and Vice-President Juan Afara of the Colorado Party were not eligible for re-election. The presidential elections were won by the Colorado Party's Mario Abdo Benítez, who defeated Efraín Alegre of the GANAR alliance. The Colorado Party also won the most seats in the Senate and Chamber of Deputies. The new President and Vice-President took office on 15 August 2018 and will leave office in August 2023.

Electoral system
The President of Paraguay is elected in one round of voting by plurality. The 80 members of the Chamber of Deputies are elected by closed list proportional representation in 18 multi-member constituencies based on the departments. The 45 members of the Senate are elected from a single national constituency using closed list proportional representation.

Opinion polls

Results

President

Senate

Elected Senators

Source: ABC Color

Chamber of Deputies

Departmental Governors

References 

Presidential elections in Paraguay
Paraguay
Elections in Paraguay
2018 in Paraguay